Aethes lygrana is a species of moth of the family Tortricidae. It is found in Israel.

References

Moths described in 1992
lygrana
Moths of the Middle East